Albert Chaumarat (8 July 1925 – 1 November 2013) was a French racing cyclist. He rode in the 1952 Tour de France.

References

External links
 

1925 births
2013 deaths
French male cyclists